Canton is an incorporated town in St. Lawrence County, New York. The population was 11,638 at the time of the 2020 census. The town contains two villages: one also named Canton, the other named Rensselaer Falls. The town is named after the great port of Canton (now named Guangzhou) in China. Canton is the home of St. Lawrence University and the State University of New York at Canton. The Canton Central School District is based in the village of Canton.

History

Humans have been present in this region of New York since the Paleo-Indian period which is from about 15,000-7,000 BC. Iroquoian peoples arrived between 1,200 and 4,000 years ago, and both the Mohawk and the Oneida consider the Adirondacks to be part of their territory. When white settlers began to arrive, the area was part of the Mohawk Nation, which was part of the Iroquois Confederacy. The Mohawks are known as Kanienkehaka, or "the people of the flint," and they were considered the keepers of the Eastern door for this edge of Haudenosaunee territory. The first settler arrived in 1800. The town was organized/incorporated on May 14, 1805, from part of the town of Lisbon. The name Canton was supposedly  selected due to contemporary interests in the China trade. Canton was one of the original ten towns of the county. In 1845, the community of Canton was incorporated as a village. The Brick Chapel Church and Cemetery was listed on the National Register of Historic Places in 2005.

Geography
After the War of 1812, the sovereign territory known as Akwesasne was bisected in two when the United States and Great Britain drew a line on a map, creating today's northern border between New York state and Canada. Now the Akwesasne Mohawk reservation sits in both countries, with borders of its own.

According to the United States Census Bureau, the town has a total area of 105.9square miles, of which 104.8 square miles (27are land and 1.1 are water.

The Grasse River flows northward through the centre of St. Lawrence County, and the Oswegatchie River flows through the northwest corner. U.S. Route 11 is a northeast–southwest highway, which intersects New York State Route 68 and New York State Route 310 at Canton village.

Climate

Demographics

, the census reported that there were 10,334 people, 3,198 households, and 2,011 families residing in the town. The population density was 98.6 people per square mile (38.1/km2). There were 3,515 housing units at an average density of 33.5 per square mile (12.9/km2). 91.81% White, 4.49% Black or African American, 0.54% Native American, 0.99% Asian, 1.02% from other races, and 1.16% from two or more races. Hispanic or Latino of any race were 1.92% of the population. There were 3,198 households, out of which 31.8% had children under the age of 18 living with them, 49.3% were married couples living together, 9.8% had a female householder with no husband present, and 37.1% were non-families. 29.8% of all households were made up of individuals, and 11.0% had someone living alone who was 65 years of age or older. The average household size was 2.40 and the average family size was 2.99.

In the town, the population was spread out, with 18.9% under the age of 18, 29.6% from 18 to 24, 21.8% from 25 to 44, 18.4% from 45 to 64, and 11.4% who were 65 years of age or older. The median age was 27 years. For every 100 females, there were 99.7 males. For every 100 females age 18 and over, there were 98.6 males.

The median income for a household in the town was $36,875, and the median income for a family was $43,819. Males had a median income of $33,993 versus $25,989 for females. The per capita income for the town was $14,896. About 9.2% of families and 12.4% of the population were below the poverty line, including 13.6% of those under age 18 and 7.5% of those age 65 or over.

Transportation
U.S. Route 11 runs through Canton and is served by Adirondack Trailways, with stops in Gouverneur, Watertown and Syracuse to the west, and Potsdam, Malone and Rouses Point to the east. To the north on New York State Route 68, Ogdensburg borders Canada at the Johnstown crossing, which in turn is an hour from the capital, Ottawa.

The New York Central Railroad's St. Lawrence Division runs through the town. Until 1964 the New York Central operated passenger trains from Massena, through the town, to Watertown, and to Syracuse to meet up with the NYC mainline.

Communities and locations in the town
Crary Mills – A hamlet southwest of Canton village.
Brick Chapel – A hamlet south of Canton village on County Road 27.
Canton – A village centrally located in the town by the Grasse River and US-11.
Eddy – A hamlet in the southwestern corner of the town on US-11.
Morley – A hamlet on the northern town line by the Grasse River at the intersection of County Roads 14 and 27. The community was originally known as "Long Rapids." 
Pyrites – A hamlet in the southwestern corner of the town on US-11.
Rensselaer Falls – A village in the northwestern corner of the town on County Roads 14 and 15.
St. Lawrence University – A university in Canton village.
SUNY Canton – A state college northwest of Canton village.
Upper and Lower Lakes State Wildlife Area
Woodbridge Corners – A location NY-68 northwest of Canton village.
St. Regis Mohawk Reservation

Notable people
 Irving Bacheller, writer and journalist
 Charles Edward Bennett, Florida congressman, was born in Canton
 Dan Brady, ice hockey player for Boston University and Western Hockey League
 Greg Carvel, UMass ice hockey head coach
 Cynthia Eloise Cleveland, lawyer and writer, born in Canton
 Theodore Conkey, Wisconsin politician
 Jordan Greenway, NHL player for the Buffalo Sabres
 A. Barton Hepburn, financier, philanthropist and U.S. Comptroller of the Currency
 Dave Jennings, professional American football player; played for St. Lawrence University
 David O'Brien Martin, New York politician and attorney
 Wade Megan, ice hockey player
 Frederic Remington, artist
 William Pierce Rogers, United States Secretary of State
 Matthew Skoller, Chicago blues harmonicist, singer, songwriter, and record producer 
 Hobart Stocking (1846–1920), Wisconsin legislator
 Silas Wright, New York State Governor
 Waydown Wailers

References

External links

 Canton town website
  Canton area information
  Canton information and links
  Canton history

Towns in St. Lawrence County, New York